Andriy Budnyi (born 20 September 1982) is a Ukrainian footballer.

Career

College and Amateur
In 2002, Budnyi attended Bard College. He transferred to San Jose State University in 2002.  He then transferred to Azusa Pacific University, where he earned the 2005 Golden State Athletic Conference and Region II Player of the Year award.

During his college years he also played two seasons with Cascade Surge in the USL Premier Development League, helping the team to two PDL Northwest Division titles, and being named to the PDL All-Western Conference teams in both 2004 and 2005.

Professional
Having spent much of the early part of 2006 training with Chivas USA of Major League Soccer, Budnyi signed his first professional contract with Charlotte Eagles of the USL Second Division on 28 June 2006, and subsequently played in 8 games for the team, scoring 1 goal.

Budnyi returned to his homeland in 2006, playing initially for Arsenal Bila Tserkva and then for Obolon Kyiv. He was the top scorer for Obolon's reserves, FC Obolon-2 Kyiv, in the Ukrainian Second League in 2007–2008, with 20 goals.

Budnyi returned to the United States in early 2009, and joined Carolina RailHawks of the USL First Division in April 2009.  On 22 July 2009, the RailHawks sent him on loan for one game to the Wilmington Hammerheads of the USL Second Division. On 22 February 2010 Carolina announced the re-signing of Budnyi to a new contract for the 2010 season.

Budnyi joined USL Pro club Wilmington Hammerheads in February 2011.

Budnyi joined the Syracuse Silver Knights in 2011. He did not re-sign at the start of the new season.

Budnyi returned the struggling Syracuse Silver Knights after signing a contract after the 2012–13 season had begun to add more firepower to their attack.

References

External links
 Azusa Pacific coaching profile
 Carolina RailHawks bio

1986 births
Living people
North Carolina FC players
Cascade Surge players
Charlotte Eagles players
San Jose State Spartans men's soccer players
Azusa Pacific Cougars men's soccer players
Syracuse Silver Knights players
Wilmington Hammerheads FC players
VSI Tampa Bay FC players
Ukrainian footballers
Ukrainian expatriate footballers
USL First Division players
USL Second Division players
FC Obolon-Brovar Kyiv players
USSF Division 2 Professional League players
USL League Two players
USL Championship players
Major Indoor Soccer League (2008–2014) players
Association football forwards
Ontario Fury players
Southern California Seahorses players
FC Golden State Force players
Azusa Pacific Cougars men's soccer coaches
Bard Raptors men's soccer players
Sportspeople from Chernivtsi